Matthys Boshoff  'Thys' Burger (born 3 Augustus 1954 in Pietersburg, Limpopo, South Africa) is a former South African rugby union player.

Playing career
Burger played for Northern Transvaal and made his provincial debut in 1976. Burger's first test for the Springboks was on 14 June 1980 in the second test against the touring British Lions team at the Free State Stadium, Bloemfontein, when he replaced Rob Louw late in the second half. He also toured with the Springboks to South America, where he made his first start in a test, as eighthman during the test in Montevideo. He scored his first test try in this match.

Burger was part of the squad that toured to New Zealand and the United States in 1981. He played in the test against the USA, once again as a replacement, this time for Theuns Stofberg and he also scored his second test try in this match.

Test history

Personal

Burger is the father of Philip Burger, a former professional rugby player and South African sevens (Blitzboks) player.

See also
List of South Africa national rugby union players – Springbok no. 511

References

1954 births
Living people
South African rugby union players
South Africa international rugby union players
Blue Bulls players
People from Polokwane
Rugby union players from Limpopo
Rugby union number eights